Matthew Philip Canepa is an American historian of art, and archaeology; as well as a writer and educator. He is a Professor of Art History and inaugural holder of the Elahé Omidyar Mir-Djalali Presidential Chair in Art History and Archaeology of Ancient Iran at the University of California, Irvine.

Canepa received his PhD from the University of Chicago. Canepa is actively involved in UC Irvine's Samuel Jordan Center for Persian Studies and Culture. According to Canepa's profile page at UC Irvine: "An historian of art, archaeology and religions his research focuses on the intersection of art, ritual and power in the eastern Mediterranean, Persia and the wider Iranian world". Canepa is also affiliated to the faculty of the Classics department of the University of California, Irvine. Canepa is, and has been, a fellow of numerous institutions, including the Society of Antiquaries of London, The Institute for Advanced Study (Princeton), The American Council of Learned Societies, the German Archaeological Institute and Merton College (University of Oxford). Canepa is, and has been, a fellow of numerous institutions, including the Society of Antiquaries of London, The Institute for Advanced Study (Princeton), The American Council of Learned Societies, the German Archaeological Institute and Merton College (University of Oxford).

Selected publications
A selection of Canepa's works:
 
 
 Area advisor and editor for The Oxford Dictionary of Late Antiquity (2018)

References

American art historians
University of Chicago alumni
Iranologists
American classical scholars
University of California, Irvine faculty
Religious studies scholars
Fellows of the Society of Antiquaries of London
Institute for Advanced Study people
ACLS Fellows
German Archaeological Institute
Living people
Year of birth missing (living people)